WVIC-LP is a variety formatted low-power broadcast radio station licensed to Saint Paul, Minnesota, serving portions of the eastside of St. Paul and Maplewood. The station is owned by the Victoria Theatre Project.

The station has a relationship with KPPS 97.5 FM 
St. Louis Park.

References

External links
 

2019 establishments in Minnesota
Variety radio stations in the United States
Radio stations established in 2019
Radio stations in Minnesota
Low-power FM radio stations in Minnesota